The 2014 United States House of Representatives elections in Alabama took place on November 4, 2014. Voters elected the 7 U.S. representatives from the state of Alabama. The elections coincided with the elections of other offices, including the Governor of Alabama.

Primary elections were held on June 3, 2014. Primary runoffs, necessary if no candidate won a majority of the vote, were held on July 15.

Overview
Results of the 2014 United States House of Representatives elections in Alabama by district:

District 1

Republican Bradley Byrne won the December 2013 special election held after the resignation of Jo Bonner. He was originally believed to be running for re-election unopposed, but Burton LeFlore, his Democratic opponent in the 2013 special election, managed to qualify.

General election

District 2

Republican Martha Roby has represented the district since being elected in 2010. She faced Democrat Erick Wright, the only other candidate to file for the office.

General election

District 3

Republican Mike D. Rogers has represented the district since being elected in 2002. He defeated challenger Thomas Casson in the Republican primary. Democrat Jesse T. Smith is also running.

Primary results

General election

District 4

Republican Robert Aderholt has represented the district since being elected in 1996. He was challenged in the Republican primary by Thomas E. Drake II. No Democrat filed for the office.

General election

District 5

Republican Mo Brooks has represented the district since being elected in 2010, after defeating the incumbent, party switching Democrat-turned-Republican Parker Griffith, in the Republican primary. Griffith ran again in the Republican primary in 2012, and Brooks won again. Supporters of Griffith circulated petitions to get Griffith on the ballot as an independent. He considered doing so, but instead rejoined the Democratic Party and is running for Governor. No Democrat filed to run. Brooks defeated challenger Jerry Hill in the Republican primary. Mark Bray is challenging Brooks as an independent candidate. Reggie Hill is running as a write-in candidate.

Primary results

General election

District 6

Republican incumbent Spencer Bachus, who has represented the 6th district since 1993, is not running for re-election.

Republican primary

Candidates
Declared
 Scott Beason, state senator and candidate for the seat in 2012
 Will Brooke, executive vice president and managing partner of Harbert Management Corporation
 Paul DeMarco, state representative
 Chad Mathis, orthopedic surgeon
 Gary Palmer, president of the conservative think tank Alabama Policy Institute
 Robert Shattuck, attorney
 Tom Vigneulle, businessman

Declined
 Spencer Bachus, incumbent U.S. Representative
 Slade Blackwell, state senator
 Bill Armistead, chairman of the Alabama Republican Party and former state senator
 Greg Canfield, Secretary of the Alabama Department of Commerce and former state representative
 David Carrington, president of the Jefferson County Commission
 Steve French, former state senator
 Tony Petelos, Jefferson County Manager
 Minda Riley Campbell, attorney and daughter of former governor Bob Riley
 Rob Riley, attorney and son of former governor Riley
 Cliff Sims, blogger
 David Standridge, state representative and candidate for the seat in 2012
 Cam Ward, state senator
 Jack Williams, state representative

Polling

Results

DeMarco and Palmer advanced to a July 15 runoff election to decide the Republican primary, which Palmer won.

Runoff

Polling

Results

General election
Palmer faced Democrat Mark Lester, a professor at Birmingham-Southern College who replaced original nominee Avery Vise, in November. Robert Shattuck, who lost in the Republican primary, will run as a write-in candidate. Libertarian Aimee Love had been running, but the Alabama Libertarian Party was unable to secure ballot access for federal elections.

District 7

Democrat Terri Sewell has represented the district since being elected in 2010. She faced a primary challenge from former Birmingham City Attorney Tamara Harris Johnson. No Republican filed to run for the office.

Primary results

General election

References

External links
U.S. House elections in Alabama, 2014 at Ballotpedia
Campaign contributions at OpenSecrets

Alabama
2014
2014 Alabama elections